NGC 5676 is an unbarred spiral galaxy in the constellation Boötes.

Disk

This spiral galaxy is notably asymmetric.  The spiral arms on the south side of the galaxy are chaotic in appearance, whereas the spiral arms on the north side of the galaxy are very well-defined.  Also, the spiral arms on the south side of the disk extend twice as far from the galaxy's nucleus as the spiral arms on the north side.  Because of the fragmentary appearance of some of the spiral arms, this galaxy is classified as a flocculent galaxy.

Star formation

The north part of the disk also contains what appears to be a very intense region of star formation.  Unusually, the star formation within this region appears to be more intense than the star formation in the galaxy's nucleus, and it is the brightest infrared source within the disk.

References

External links

 www.freewebs.com/
 Image NGC 5676

NGC 5676
Boötes
5676
09366
51978